Mary Margaret Gabrielse (born 1923) is a Dutch illustrator and former champion swimmer.

She was born in Tjimahi, and is the niece of Johannes Gabrielse.

Just before World War II she was a champion swimmer holding several Dutch East Indies swim records as well as Asian swimming records.

After the war she became an artist having studied art at school. She also was an artist and interned in the Japanese camps of World War II. She survived as did a number of her colour illustrations reflecting camp life in the women's camp and now at the museum Museon.

Her other work produced after the war is in private hands. She was not prolific due to family responsibilities but with her habit of illustrating her letters to her very large correspondence contacts has ensured that her work is well spread and in many hands.

References

External links
Article in Dutch encyclopedia on Johannes Gabrielse 
Museum with both artists work

1923 births
Dutch illustrators
Dutch women illustrators
World War II civilian prisoners held by Japan
Possibly living people
Dutch people of the Dutch East Indies